This list of castles in Nord-Pas-de-Calais is a list of medieval castles or château forts in the region in northern France.

Links in italics are links to articles in the French Wikipedia.

Nord

Pas-de-Calais

See also
 List of castles in France
 List of châteaux in France

References